Sviatoslav Soulima Stravinsky (23 September 191028 November 1994) was a Swiss-American pianist, composer, and musicologist. As a pianist, he was considered an important interpreter of the works of his father, Igor Stravinsky, but as a composer he was overshadowed by his father.

Biography
Soulima Stravinsky was born in Lausanne, Switzerland, in 1910, the second son and third child of Igor Stravinsky and Katherine Nossenko, and the grandson of Fyodor Stravinsky. He studied piano with Isidor Philipp as well as theory and composition with Nadia Boulanger.  He appeared in Paris in 1934 playing his father's Concerto for Piano and Winds, Capriccio for Piano and Orchestra and the Concerto for Two Pianos.  He recorded these works with his father in 1938.

He played in London at the 1937 season of the Proms.

Igor Stravinsky moved to the United States in 1939, but Soulima joined the French army and remained in Europe for nine more years. He moved to the United States in 1948, making his American debut that year at the Red Rocks Festival in Colorado and his New York debut with the CBS Symphony Orchestra.

In 1950, Soulima Stravinsky was appointed to the piano faculty of the School of Music of the University of Illinois, where he remained until 1978. He continued his concerto solo career and began distinguishing himself as a composer, transcriber and editor. In addition to his many musical compositions, he wrote books on orchestration and the orchestra. His book on orchestration contains an excellent section on brass instruments including many unusual instruments.

In 1974, Stravinsky was awarded the "Chevalier des Arts et des Lettres" by the French Ministry of Cultural Affairs.

He died in Sarasota, Florida in 1994.

About nine months after his death, his widow Francoise found a previously unknown work amongst Soulima's papers—a Lamento for cello and piano. It was in incomplete form, but it was edited and performed for the first time before Francoise herself died.

Works
Etudes Pittoresques (20), for piano
The Art of Scales (24 Preludes), for piano
The Art of Fingering (12 Preludes), for piano
6 Sonatinas for Young Pianists, for piano (or harpsichord)
Piano Suite for the Right Hand
Music Alphabet, for piano
Piano Music for Children, Volume 1 (19 pieces)
Suite for Viola Solo (1975)
Sonata for Cello and Piano (1990)
Lamento, cello and piano (posth.)
Three string quartets (recorded on CD, label Polymnie)
Cadenzas (18) and lead-ins (4) to Mozart's piano concerti:
No. 6 in B flat, K. 238
No. 8 in C, K. 246
Double Concerto in E flat, K. 365
No. 11 in F, K. 413
No. 20 in D minor, K. 466
No. 21 in C, K. 467 Elvira Madigan
No. 22 in E flat, K. 482
No. 24 in C minor, K. 491
No. 25 in C, K. 503, and 
No. 26 in D, K. 537 Coronation.

References

External links 
The Soulima Stravinsky papers in the Music Division of The New York Public Library for the Performing Arts.

1910 births
1994 deaths
Swiss classical composers
Swiss male classical composers
Swiss classical pianists
20th-century classical composers
Igor Stravinsky
American people of Russian descent
American people of Ukrainian descent
Swiss people of Ukrainian descent
Swiss emigrants to the United States
People from Lausanne
University of Illinois faculty
Chevaliers of the Ordre des Arts et des Lettres
Pupils of Isidor Philipp
20th-century classical pianists
20th-century American composers
Male classical pianists
20th-century American male musicians
20th-century Swiss composers